In 19th century German education,  Technicum was a lower grade of vocational schools (lower than the polytechnical institute), with training of 2.5–4 years. 

This term was borrowed in Poland (Technikum) and in Russia (Tekhnikum).

References

School types
Education in Germany